T. terrestris  may refer to:
 Tapirus terrestris, a mammal species
 Testudo terrestris, a tortoise species in the genus Testudo
 Tribulus terrestris, a plant species
 Trox terrestris, a beetle species
 Trugon terrestris, a bird species

See also
 Terrestris